Sir David Rodney Sweetnam  (1927–2013), known as Rodney, was a British orthopaedic surgeon.

Early life 
Sweetnam was born on 5 February 1927, in Wimbledon, south London, to Irene (née Black), a former medical student, and William Sweetnam, a GP. He was educated at Clayesmore School.

Career 
From 1950 to 1952 he undertook National Service as a surgeon-lieutenant aboard .

From 1974 to 1992 he was consultant orthopaedic surgeon at the Middlesex Hospital and at University College Hospital, becoming emeritus upon retirement.

He was also a consultant adviser in orthopaedic surgery to the United Kingdom's Department of Health from 1981 to 1990.

He was orthopaedic surgeon to Elizabeth II (1982–92) and president of the Royal College of Surgeons (1995–98). He was also president of the British Orthopaedic Association (1985); and a Fellow of University College London.

He was made a Commander of the Order of the British Empire (CBE) in the 1990 New Year Honours and a Knight Commander of the Royal Victorian Order (KCVO) in the 1992 New Year Honours.

He died on 17 May 2013.

References

External links 
 

1927 births
2013 deaths
British orthopaedic surgeons
Knights Commander of the Royal Victorian Order
Commanders of the Order of the British Empire
Fellows of the Royal College of Surgeons
Fellows of the Royal College of Physicians
Royal Navy officers
People educated at Clayesmore School